Antonia Santilli (born 8 August 1949) is an Italian former actress and model. Born in Spigno Saturnia, Lazio, she began modelling and acting in theatre productions while enrolled at the Sapienza University of Rome. In 1971, she appeared in an issue of the adult magazine Playmen. She appeared in twelve films between 1971 and 1974. Her final film role was in the comedy Unbelievable Adventures of Italians in Russia (1974), shot in the Soviet Union.

Filmography

References

External links

1949 births
Living people
Italian female models
Italian film actresses
People from the Province of Latina
Sapienza University of Rome alumni